Gregory ("Greg") Roy Richards (born 25 April 1956 in Birmingham, West Midlands) is a retired male decathlete from England.

Athletics career
Richards competed for Great Britain at the 1988 Summer Olympics. He set his personal best (7740 points) in the men's decathlon in 1987. He represented England in the decathlon event, at the 1986 Commonwealth Games in Edinburgh, Scotland.

Achievements

Coaching
Richards has gone on to coach many athletes including 2000 Olympic Games decathlon gold medallist Erki Nool of Estonia and 2006 Commonwealth Games English decathlon gold medallist Dean Macey.

References

1956 births
Living people
British decathletes
English decathletes
Athletes (track and field) at the 1988 Summer Olympics
Olympic athletes of Great Britain
Sportspeople from Birmingham, West Midlands
British male athletes
Athletes (track and field) at the 1986 Commonwealth Games
Commonwealth Games competitors for England